The Greater Caucasus (Бөјүк Гафгаз, بيوک قافقاز; , Didi K’avk’asioni; , Bolshoy Kavkaz, sometimes translated as "Caucasus Major", "Big Caucasus" or "Large Caucasus") is the major mountain range of the Caucasus Mountains.

Geography

The range is traditionally separated into three parts:

 The Western Caucasus between the Black Sea and Mount Elbrus
 The Central Caucasus between Mount Elbrus and Mount Kazbek
 The Eastern Caucasus between Mount Kazbek and the Caspian Sea

In the drier Eastern Caucasus, the mountains are mostly treeless.

Europe–Asia boundary
The watershed of the Caucasus is also considered by some to be the boundary between Eastern Europe and Western Asia. The European part to the north of the watershed is known as Ciscaucasia; the Asiatic part to the south as Transcaucasia, which is dominated by the Lesser Caucasus mountain range and whose western portion converges with Eastern Anatolia.

Most of the border of Russia with Georgia and Azerbaijan runs along most of the Caucasus' length.

Watershed
The watershed of the Caucasus was the border between the Caucasia province of the Russian Empire in the north and the Ottoman Empire and Persia in the south (1801) until the Russian victory in 1813 and the Treaty of Gulistan which moved the border of the Russian Empire well within Transcaucasia.
The border between Georgia and Russia still follows the watershed almost exactly (except for Georgia's western border, which extends south of the watershed, and a narrow strip of territory in northwestern Kakheti and northern Mtskheta-Mtianeti where Georgia extends north of the watershed), while Azerbaijan is south of the watershed except that its northeastern corner has five districts north of the watershed (Khachmaz, Quba, Qusar, Shabran, and Siazan).

Peaks

Mount Elbrus,  is the highest mountain in Europe.
Dykh-Tau, 
Shkhara, 
Koshtan-Tau, 
Shota Rustaveli Peak, 
Kazbek (Mkinvartsveri), 
Tebulosmta, 
Diklosmta, 
Bazardüzü, 
Babadag, 
Katyn-Tau, 
Janga, 
Tetnuldi, 
Ushba, 
Ailama, 
Mount Karakaya, highest of the Skalisty Range, Caucasus

Passes
Bogovatchosgele Pass , 
Abano Pass , 
Mamison Pass , 
Datvisjvari Pass , 
Marukhi Pass ,)
Pereval Klukhorskiy , 
Jvari Pass , 
Dübrar Pass ,

See also
Skalisty Range, Caucasus

References

+
Mountain ranges of Azerbaijan
Mountain ranges of Georgia (country)
Mountain ranges of Russia
Lists of coordinates
Geography of the Caucasus
Physiographic sections
Landforms of North Ossetia–Alania
Mountains of Krasnodar Krai
Mountain ranges of Europe